Mathieu Ostiguy (born January 27, 1997) is a former Canadian pair skater. He won the 2019 Canadian junior nationals with partner Chloe Choinard. With partner Justine Brasseur, he placed fourth at the 2016 Youth Olympics in Hamar and seventh at the 2016 World Junior Championships in Debrecen.

Brasseur/Ostiguy began skating together in May 2014. They were coached by Bruno Marcotte, Richard Gauthier, Sylvie Fullum, and Julie Marcotte. Their partnership ended after the 2016–2017 season. In spring 2017, Ostiguy teamed up with Chloe Choinard. He and Choinhard broke up in Summer 2019, and on February 18, 2020, Ostiguy retired.

Programs

With Choinard

With Brasseur

Competitive highlights 
JGP: Junior Grand Prix

Pairs with Choinard

Pairs with Brasseur

Single skating

References

External links 

 

1997 births
Canadian male pair skaters
Living people
People from Granby, Quebec
Figure skaters at the 2016 Winter Youth Olympics
20th-century Canadian people
21st-century Canadian people